The 1991 Chicago White Sox season was the White Sox's 92nd season. They finished with a record of 87-75, good enough for 2nd place in the American League West, 8 games behind of the 1st place Minnesota Twins, as the club opened the new Comiskey Park on April 18.

Offseason 
 November 30, 1990: Jerry Willard was released by the White Sox.
 December 3, 1990: Buddy Groom was drafted from the White Sox by the Detroit Tigers in the 1990 minor league draft.
 December 4, 1990: Shawn Hillegas and Eric King were traded by the White Sox to the Cleveland Indians for Cory Snyder and Lindsay Foster (minors).
 December 12, 1990: Charlie Hough was signed as a free agent by the White Sox.
 December 23, 1990: Iván Calderón and Barry Jones were traded by the White Sox to the Montreal Expos for Tim Raines, Jeff Carter and a player to be named later. The Expos completed the deal by sending Mario Brito (minors) to the White Sox on February 15.
 March 18, 1991: Ron Coomer was signed as a free agent with the Chicago White Sox.
 March 31, 1991: Joe Borowski was traded by the White Sox to the Baltimore Orioles for Pete Rose Jr.

Regular season 
 Frank Thomas led the Major Leagues in on-base percentage with .457. He became the 38th player in history to reach base at least 300 times in one season.

New Comiskey Park 

 The White Sox started the season at new Comiskey Park. The park opened for the 1991 season, after the White Sox had spent 80 years at Comiskey Park. The new park was completed at a cost of US$167 million.
 The stadium was the first new sports venue built in Chicago since 1929, when Chicago Stadium was built. It was also the first baseball-only park since Royals Stadium (now Kauffman Stadium) opened in 1973, and the last built before the recent wave of new "retro-classic" stadiums. However, a few design features from the old park were retained. Most notable among them is the "exploding scoreboard", which is a replica of the one installed by Bill Veeck at the old park in 1960.
 Keeping up with tradition, after a White Sox player hits a home run, and eventually, at the beginning of all games, as well as after a White Sox victory, the scoreboard lights up in color and fireworks explode in the sky. The ballpark, as well as its entrance has several exterior arched windows. The Sox Shower, located in left-center field, is a place where fans can cool off during hot gamedays.
 The first game at new Comiskey was on April 18, 1991, against the Detroit Tigers. Despite starting the season on the road with a 6-1 record, the White Sox lost the game by a score of 16-0.

First Game at New Comiskey

Scorecard 
April 18, New Comiskey Park, Chicago, Illinois

Batting

Pitching

1991 Opening Day lineup 
 Tim Raines, DH
 Lance Johnson, CF
 Robin Ventura, 3B
 Frank Thomas, 1B
 Carlton Fisk, C
 Cory Snyder, LF
 Sammy Sosa, RF
 Ozzie Guillén, SS
 Scott Fletcher, 2B
 Jack McDowell, P

Season standings

Record vs. opponents

Notable transactions 
 April 3, 1991: Bo Jackson was signed as a free agent by the White Sox.
 April 12, 1991: Danny Heep was signed as a free agent by the White Sox.
 April 13, 1991: Steve Lyons was released by the White Sox.
 May 18, 1991: Magglio Ordóñez was signed as an amateur free agent by the White Sox.
 July 12, 1991: Mike Huff was selected off waivers by the White Sox from the Cleveland Indians.
 July 14, 1991: Cory Snyder was traded by the White Sox to the Toronto Blue Jays for Shawn Jeter and a player to be named later. The Blue Jays completed the deal by sending Steve Wapnick to the White Sox on September 4.

Roster

Player stats

Batting 
Note: G = Games played; AB = At bats; R = Runs scored; H = Hits; 2B = Doubles; 3B = Triples; HR = Home runs; RBI = Runs batted in; BB = Base on balls; SO = Strikeouts; AVG = Batting average; SB = Stolen bases

Pitching 
Note: W = Wins; L = Losses; ERA = Earned run average; G = Games pitched; GS = Games started; SV = Saves; IP = Innings pitched; H = Hits allowed; R = Runs allowed; ER = Earned runs allowed; HR = Home runs allowed; BB = Walks allowed; K = Strikeouts

Awards and honors 
 Frank Thomas – Major League Baseball Leader, On-Base Percentage (.457)
All-Star Game
 Jack McDowell, pitcher, reserve
 Carlton Fisk, catcher, reserve
 Ozzie Guillén, shortstop, reserve

Farm system

References

External links 
 1991 Chicago White Sox at Baseball Reference
 1991 Chicago White Sox team page at www.baseball-almanac.com

Chicago White Sox seasons
Chicago White Sox season
White